This is a list of airports in Montenegro, grouped by type and sorted by location.

Passenger statistics
Airports with number of passengers served.

Airports 

Airports shown in bold have scheduled service on commercial airlines.

See also
 Transport in Montenegro
 List of airports by ICAO code: L#LY – Serbia and Montenegro
 Wikipedia:WikiProject Aviation/Airline destination lists: Europe#Montenegro

References 
  AERODROMI u PDF formatu
 
 
  – includes IATA codes
  – IATA and ICAO codes
  – IATA, ICAO and DAFIF codes

Montenegro
 
Airports
Airports
Montenegro